Warmi Wañusqa (Quechua warmi woman, wife, wañusqa died, dead, "woman (who) died" or "dead woman", also spelled Huarmihuañusca) is a mountain in the Andes of Peru which reaches a height of approximately . It is located in the Huánuco Region, Huamalíes Province, Llata District. A lake named Yanaqucha lies at its feet.

References 

Mountains of Peru
Mountains of Huánuco Region